Máel Ísu II is the sixth alleged Bishop of the Scots, equivalent to latter day St. Andrews. He is mentioned in the bishop-lists of the 15th-century historians Walter Bower and Andrew of Wyntoun as the successor of Cellach II. We have no direct dates for Máel Ísu II's episcopate, but the indirect evidence for his predecessors suggests that he was bishop in the late 10th and/or early 11th century.

Notes

References
MacQueen, John, MacQueen, Winifred & Watt, D.E.R. (eds.), Scottichronicon by Walter Bower in Latin and English, Vol. 3, (Aberdeen, 1995)

10th-century births
980s deaths
Bishops of St Andrews
Medieval Gaels from Scotland
10th-century Scottish bishops
11th-century Scottish Roman Catholic bishops